Indonesia competed at the 1988 Summer Paralympics in Seoul, South Korea. Indonesia won 2 medals, both silver, finishing 43rd in the medal table.

Medalists

See also
 1988 Paralympic Games
 1988 Olympic Games
 Indonesia at the Paralympics
 Indonesia at the Olympics
 Indonesia at the 1988 Summer Olympics

References 

Indonesia at the Paralympics
1988 in Indonesian sport
Nations at the 1988 Summer Paralympics